AP-1 complex subunit mu-1 is a protein that in humans is encoded by the AP1M1 gene.

Function 

The protein encoded by this gene is the medium chain of the trans-Golgi network clathrin-associated protein complex AP-1. The other components of this complex are beta-prime-adaptin, gamma-adaptin, and the small chain AP1S1. This complex is located at the Golgi vesicle and links clathrin to receptors in coated vesicles. These vesicles are involved in endocytosis and Golgi processing.

Interactions 

AP1M1 has been shown to interact with VAMP4 and AP1G1.

References

Further reading

External links